Chicken Wings is an aviation related comic series that is published as a webcomic as well as a regular comic strip in various aviation magazines around the world. It was created by brothers Michael Strasser and Stefan Strasser in late 2001. Since 2004 a weekly strip is being published regularly on their website.

The comic is especially popular among people who have some relation with or affinity to this particular industry, from pilots over airline personnel to modelers or flight simmers. As the artists try to appeal to this niche market of aviation fans, a few of the jokes are hard to understand or simply not funny for outsiders.

The creators
Michael Strasser is a helicopter pilot and flight instructor who lives and works in California. His brother Stefan Strasser is a cartoonist and illustrator who lives in Vienna. Together they combine the background knowledge and artistic skills needed for this project.

Characters

Many characters are based on one or more real life persons. E.g. "Captain Ed" is based on the airline captain/author Ed Owen (Your Captain Speaking) and the name "Chuck" was inspired by Chuck Aaron, currently the only helicopter aerobatics pilot in the USA.

Main

Chuck

Chuck is the pilot of "Roost Air" and features all the stereotypical characteristics that are associated with pilots: He always wears big and expensive sunglasses and a big and expensive watch. He is known and feared by air traffic controllers because of his one-of-a-kind sense of direction and knowledge of radio procedures. Chuck likes to think of himself as a womanizer, or rather a "chickenizer", but usually ends up alone due to his mouth and his inability to think before he speaks (or, as other cases prove, inability to think at all). His reputation has spread far and wide, and when he gets into a particularly absurd situation or exchange on the radio, there will often be the question "Chuck, is that you?"

Julio

Julio is the typical aircraft mechanic who can fix everything from a helicopter turbine engine to Sally's coffee machine. He doesn't talk too much and doesn't really like pilots a lot. They tend to break "his" planes and never treat them the way he would like. His nickname is "Sparks", which seems to have originated from an unlucky hand with electricity, so he's not very proud of it.

Sally

Sally is the flight dispatcher and secretary of "Roost Air". She's a very nice and good looking girl (at least for a chicken) and can make a killer coffee that can keep pilots awake for two nights in a row. Sally is always motivated and in high spirits, but unfortunately, aviation seems to be sort of a foreign language to her.

Hans

Hans is the boss of "Roost Air" who has inherited the company from his uncle and used to run a yogurt factory before. But in his opinion "there can't be that much difference between yogurt and airplanes", so his resourceful management strategies turn out to be the main cause of things going wrong and turning complicated in the company. He has a slight German accent which he can't always hide.

Supporting

Jason

Jason is Chuck's flight student. He is very interested in everything related to aviation and has serious difficulties to hold his curiosity in check. While Sally and Hans love him, because he owns a chocolate factory, and Chuck can usually endure Jasons inquisitive manner, he often drives Julio crazy with his drumfire of questions.

Captain Ed

Captain Ed is Chuck's uncle and also a pilot. But that's where the similarities end. He works as a captain for a major airline but is often burdened with straightening out the mess at Roost Air, trying to keep his nephew on the right track. Unlike Chuck he is known for his experience and his calm and positive manner.

Ray

Ray is the mechanic from the FBO next door. He is a duck from the south and pretty much Julios only shoulder to lean and cry on when it comes to mechanical questions.

Nobu

Nobu is the pilot from the FBO next door. He is Japanese but has been living in the United States long enough to really master the language and to get used to a Roost-Air style of corporate culture. His full name is Nobutada Yakitori, but since nobody can pronounce it right, they call him Nobu.

Chicken Wings in print
So far the Strasser brothers published three books with their collected material. The first book was first published by Infinity Publishing. Later on the brothers decided to re-print and publish it by themselves, successfully selling it through pilot shops around the world and through their own webshop. Chicken Wings – The First Book and Chicken Wings 2 – Full Throttle.
Chicken Wings strips and cartoons are published regularly in the following magazines: Trade-A-Plane (USA), EAA Sport Aviation Magazine (USA), Americas Flyways (USA), Atlantic Flyer (USA), Pilot Magazine (UK), Siivet (Finland), Flynytt (Norway), Take-Off (Portugal), Aeromarkt (Germany), Fliegermagazin (Germany) and JP4 (Italy).
An italian edition of the first three books is also available.

Bibliography

References

External links

 Chicken Wings Aviation Comic
 Chicken Wings Merchandise

Fictional birds
2000s webcomics
American comedy webcomics
Webcomics in print
Aviation comics